Invermay Agricultural Centre is located close to Mosgiel, on the Taieri Plains in Otago, New Zealand. Part of AgResearch, it is a scientific research centre specialising in research into genomics, animal reproduction, land management and biosecurity.

Its location may be viewed on the map using the following link: Ag Research Invermay

Buildings and structures in Otago
Mosgiel
Agricultural research stations
Crown Research Institutes of New Zealand
Agricultural organisations based in New Zealand